The 1901 Holy Cross football team was an American football team that represented the College of the Holy Cross as an independent during the 1901 college football season. In its third season under head coach Maurice Connor, the team compiled a 7–1–1 record and outscored opponents by a total of 126 to 43.

The 1901 season was the most successful in the school's history to that time.

Schedule

References

Holy Cross
Holy Cross Crusaders football seasons
Holy Cross football